The Clockwork Girl is a 2014 Canadian animated film based on the comic book series Clockwork Girl, created by Sean O’Reilly and Kevin Hanna. It is directed by Kevin Hanna. It stars Carrie-Anne Moss, Alexa Vega and Jesse McCartney.

Plot
In a world watched over by the Ancients (a police-like military force resembling Plague doctors), there lived A town called Haraway, where everyone builds marvelous inventions and create strange creatures, but unfortunately a strange sickness called "The Blight" has rendered almost the population to fall ill and making some of there limbs useless which made the townsfolk to seek aid from two brilliant scientists. This has made the city to split into separate factions between machinery and biological engineering and refuse to work together due to their different ideas.

One day, a nameless robot girl has recently been given the gift of life from her mechanical creator, while exploring the wonders of an ordinary world she meets an mutant boy named Huxley (who was created with two hearts) and they share a friendship that must overcome their warring families.

Cast
 Carrie-Anne Moss as Admiral Wells
 Alexa Vega as Tesla
 Jesse McCartney as Huxley
 Brad Garrett as T-Bolt
 Jeffrey Tambor as Wilhelm the Tinkerer
 Adrian Hough as Dendrus
 Tyler Nicol as Barnaby the Marmokeet
 Kevin Hanna as See-Monster, and misc Marmokeets

Production

With the release of the Clockwork Girl comic book series in 2007, co-creators Kevin Hanna and Sean O’Reilly confirmed they were working on an animated short adaptation. In July 2008, Arcana announced that it had received funding from Telefilm Canada to develop the concept into a movie. Jennica Harper joined as the film's writer in September 2008. A teaser for the movie was screened at the San Diego Comic-Con in July 2009.

A stereoscopic 3D animated feature was formally announced in July 2010 at the San Diego Comic-Con, with Hanna acting as the director and O'Reilly serving as producer. Luximation, a studio in Vancouver created specifically for the project, was confirmed to be animating it. At the same time, Alexa Vega, Jesse McCartney and Carrie-Anne Moss were cast in undisclosed roles, and funding from South Korean company CJ Entertainment was received. The following November, the film officially entered production, with Brad Garrett and Jeffrey Tambor joining the cast. At the 2012 San Diego Comic-Con, the film was previewed once again, with Arcana and co-production partner Legacy Filmworks noting that it would "release internationally in 2012."

Release
The Clockwork Girl premiered in Canada on Super Channel on January 12, 2014. The film would see little distribution until 2021, when Vertical Entertainment acquired U.S. rights to the movie. It was released in the United Kingdom through video on demand platforms on January 11, 2021, with a theatrical release set for June 8, 2021 in the United States.

References

External links
 
 

Canadian animated feature films
2014 animated films
Animated films based on comics
Films based on Canadian comics
Canadian science fiction films
Canadian fantasy films
2014 television films
2014 films
2010s Canadian films